Ring size is a measurement used to denote the circumference (or sometimes the diameter) of jewellery rings and smart rings.



Measuring tools 

Ring sizes can be measured physically by a paper, plastic, or metal ring sizer (as a gauge) or by measuring the inner diameter of a ring that already fits.

Ring sticks are tools used to measure the inner size of a ring, and are typically made from plastic, delrin, wood, aluminium, or of multiple materials. Digital ring sticks can be used for highly accurate measurements.

Measurement systems

International standard 
ISO 8653:2016 defines standard ring sizes in terms of the inner circumference of the ring measured in millimetres. ISO sizes are used in Austria, France, Germany, Belgium, Scandinavia, Netherlands (Norway, Sweden, Denmark, Finland, Iceland), and other countries in Continental Europe.

This international standard specifies a method to measure the ring-size using a ring stick with defined characteristics, which is used during manufacturing steps, and specifies the designation of the ring-size.

For jeweller-consumer relationships, the finger size is measured with a finger gauge set made up of a ring for each size with the same diameter and tolerance as the ring stick ones.  The sizes are in millimeters and correspond directly to the outer circumference of the ring stick to the inner circumference of the finger gauge.

Other traditional and regional systems 
Other ring size measurement systems are used in areas that do not use ISO 8653:2016.

North America 

The Circular of the Bureau of Standards summarizes the situation with this system: "While there apparently is only one standard in use in the United States, in reality, because of the lack of specific dimensions and because of the errors introduced by the adoption of a common commercial article as a pattern, there are many, although similar, standards."  The standards are generally consistent and remain so. There does not appear to have been any improvement in the standard since then.

Ireland, United Kingdom, Australia 
In Ireland, the United Kingdom and Australia, ring sizes are specified using an alphabetical scale with half sizes. However in 1987 BSI updated the standard to the metric system so that one alphabetical size division equals 1.25 mm of circumferential length. For a baseline, ring size C has a circumference of 40 mm.

India, Japan, China 
In India, Japan and China, ring sizes are specified using a numerical scale with whole sizes that does not have a linear correlation with diameter or circumference.

Italy, Spain, Netherlands, Switzerland, Germany 
In Italy, Spain, and Switzerland, ring sizes are specified as the circumference minus 40 mm: for example, size 10 in this system is equivalent to ISO 8653:2016 size 50.

Russia 
In Russia, ring sizes are equal to the inner diameter rounded to whole and half numbers, sometimes to quarters, for example diameter 16.92 mm is equal to size 17, 16.1 mm is equal to size 16.

Equivalency table

Resizing 
Most rings can be resized; the method of doing so depends on the complexity of the ring and its material. For example, rings of soft material may be opened using a special form of punch. In other cases, the ring may need to be cut open and material either added or removed before fusing the ring together again.  All other factors being equal, sizing a ring up will cost more than sizing a ring down: while sizing up requires the jeweler add precious metal, sizing down allows them to remove and reuse it.

Sizing beads 
Small metal beads called sizing beads can be added to the inner circumference of a ring to:
 Decrease the effective inner diameter of a ring that is too big, to aid in holding the ring in place against the finger
 Counterbalance top-heavy rings
 Keep a ring from spinning for wearers whose knuckles are much larger than their finger base

Sizing beads are typically made of the same metal as the rest of the ring since it is easier to solder two similar metals.

References 

Rings (jewellery)
Sizes in clothing

External links
Ring Size